Giorgi Kobulia (born 3 January 1970) is a Georgian politician who was Minister of Economy and Sustainable Development in the Government of Georgia from July 2018 to April 2019.

He is a graduate of Tbilisi State Medical University and Emory University (MBA, 2001).

References

1970 births
Living people
Tbilisi State Medical University alumni
Emory University alumni
Government ministers of Georgia (country)
21st-century politicians from Georgia (country)
Politicians from Tbilisi